The 1977 LSU Tigers football team represented Louisiana State University (LSU) during the 1977 NCAA Division I football season.  Under head coach Charles McClendon, the Tigers had a record of 8–4 with a Southeastern Conference record of 4–2. It was McClendon's sixteenth season as head coach at LSU.

Schedule

Roster

References

LSU
LSU Tigers football seasons
LSU Tigers football